La vida de José Rizal (The life of Jose Rizal), released in 1912, was the first feature film produced in the Philippines. It was however not the first film released in the country—a rival film, El fusilamiento de Dr. José Rizal was released on August 23, one day earlier. La Vida is a silent film that depicts the life of José Rizal, the country's national hero, from his birth to his execution in Luneta.

Americans Harry Brown (producer), Charles Martin (cinematographer), and Edward Gross (scenery), founded the Rizalina Photoplay Company in 1912 to produce the film, which was adapted from a 1905 stage play by Gross. Containing 22 scenes, the movie's film had a length of 5,000 feet.

The film, together with its rival, garnered financial success and the producers were encouraged to produce other Filipino-themed films.

Cast
José Rizal - Honorio Lopez
María Clara - Titay Molina
Teodora Alonso Realonda - Chananay

References

External links

1912 films
Cultural depictions of José Rizal
José Rizal
Philippine biographical films
Philippine silent films
Philippine black-and-white films